The 2011 Super Rugby season was the first season of the new 15-team format for the Super Rugby competition, which involved teams from Australia, New Zealand and South Africa. Including its past iterations as Super 12 and Super 14, this was the 16th season for the Southern Hemisphere's premier transnational club competition. The season kicked off in February 2011, with pre-season matches held from mid-January. It finished in early July to allow players a recovery period for the 2011 Rugby World Cup to be held in September and October; in future non-World Cup years, the competition will extend into August.

This season saw the arrival of the Melbourne Rebels, admitted to the competition as Australia's fifth team after entry by the Southern Kings from South Africa was denied. This was also the first season of a revamped competition format, with a greater focus on matches within each participating country and an expanded finals series.

During this season, the first ever Super Rugby game was played outside the SANZAR region, taking place at Twickenham Stadium between the Crusaders and the Sharks. The match was moved to Twickenham because of the February 2011 Christchurch earthquake. Proceeds of the game were also donated to the relief effort.

The final was played at Suncorp Stadium in Brisbane between the Queensland Reds and the Crusaders. The Reds won 18–13 to claim their first Super Rugby title.

Competition format

Covering 21 weeks, the schedule featured a total of 125 matches. The 15 teams were grouped by geography, labelled the Australian Conference, New Zealand Conference and the South African Conference. With the new format, the regular season consisted of two types of matches:
 Internal Conference Matches – Each team plays the other four teams in the same conference twice, home and away. (See table below for conferences.)
 Cross Conference Matches – Each team plays four teams of the other two conferences away, and four teams of the other two conferences home, thus missing out on two teams (one from each of the other conferences). Each team plays two home and two away games against teams from each of the other countries, making a total of eight cross conference games for each team.

The top team of each conference, plus the next top three teams in table points regardless of conference (wild card teams), moved on to the finals. The top two conference winners, based on table points, receive first-round byes. In the first round of the finals, the third conference winner is the No. 3 seed and hosts the wild card team with the worst record, and the best wild card team hosts the second-best wild card team. In the semi-finals, the No. 2 conference winner hosts the higher surviving seed from the first round, and the No. 1 conference winner hosts the other first-round winner. The final is hosted by the top remaining seed.

Standings

Source: NZ Herald

Legend:
 Rnd = Round completed (games played plus byes), W = Games won, D = Games drawn, L = Games lost, Bye = Number of byes, PF = Points for, PA = Points against, PD = Points difference, TB = Try bonus points, LB = Losing bonus points, Pts = Log points

Points breakdown:
 4 points for a win
 2 points for a draw
 4 points for a bye
 1 bonus point for a loss by seven points or less
 1 bonus point for scoring four or more tries in a match

The overall standings classification system:
 Three conference winners/leaders in log points order
 Three wildcard teams in log points order
 The remaining nine teams in log points order
 When teams are level on log points, they are sorted by number of games won, then overall points difference, then number of tries scored and then overall try difference

Notes:
 The Round 2 match between the Crusaders and Hurricanes scheduled for 26 February 2011 at Westpac Stadium in Wellington was abandoned by agreement of both sides and SANZAR due to the February 2011 Christchurch earthquake. The match was declared a draw, with both sides earning 2 competition points.

Fixtures

Round 1

Round 2

Note * : The match was cancelled and called a draw due to the February 2011 Christchurch earthquake.

Round 3

Round 4

Round 5

Round 6

Round 7

Round 8

Round 9

Round 10

Round 11

Round 12

Round 13

Round 14

Round 15

Round 16

Round 17

Round 18

Finals

Qualifiers
Qualifier 1

Qualifier 2

Semi-finals
Semi-final 1

Semi-final 2

Final

Player statistics

Leading try scorers 

Source: South African Rugby Union

Leading point scorers

Source: South African Rugby Union

Attendances

See also 

 Super Rugby franchise areas
 List of Super Rugby records

References

External links
 
 
 
 

 
2011
 
 
 
2011 rugby union tournaments for clubs